USS Engage is the name of two ships of the United States Navy.

 , an  that served from 1954 until 1992.

United States Navy ship names